The Battle of Averasborough or the Battle of Averasboro, fought March 16, 1865, in Harnett and Cumberland counties, North Carolina, as part of the Carolinas Campaign of the American Civil War, was a prelude to the climactic Battle of Bentonville, which began three days later.

Opposing forces

Union
Union Maj. Gen. William T. Sherman was moving his army north towards Goldsboro in two columns. The right column (Army of the Tennessee) was under the command of Maj. Gen. Oliver O. Howard and the left column (Army of Georgia) was under Maj. Gen. Henry W. Slocum.

Confederate
Confederate Gen. Joseph E. Johnston sent Lt. Gen. William J. Hardee's corps to attack Slocum's left wing while it was separated from the rest of Sherman's forces.

Battle
Slocum's troops had crossed the Cape Fear River at Fayetteville and were marching up the Raleigh plank road. Near Averasborough, they encountered Hardee's corps. On the morning of March 16, troops of the Union XX Corps under Maj. Gen. Alpheus S. Williams were driven back by a Confederate assault. When reinforcements arrived, the Union forces counterattacked and drove back two lines of Confederates, but were stopped by a third line. By this time, units from Maj. Gen. Jefferson C. Davis's XIV Corps began to arrive on the field. Outnumbered and in danger of being flanked, Hardee's troops withdrew.

Battlefield
The Battle of Averasborough was fought on the grounds of Oak Grove, near Erwin, North Carolina. Lebanon was used as a hospital. Prior to the battle, Union soldiers raided the Ellerslie Plantation for supplies and quartered troops in the plantation's main house. The Averasboro Battlefield Historic District was listed on the National Register of Historic Places in 2001. The American Battlefield Trust and its partners have acquired and preserved  of the Averasborough battlefield.

Casualties
The Confederates had not held up the Union Army as long as they had hoped. Each side suffered about 700 casualties; however, these were losses the Federals could afford while the Confederates could not.

References

External links
 Civil War Trust battle map
 National Park Service battle description
 CWSAC Report Update

Further reading
 Davis, Daniel T., and Phillip S. Greenwalt. Calamity in Carolina: The Battles of Averasboro and Bentonville, March 1865. Emerging Civil War Series. El Dorado Hills, CA: Savas Beatie, 2015. .
 Smith, Mark A., and Wade Sokolosky. No Such Army Since the Days of Julius Caesar: Sherman's Carolinas Campaign from Fayetteville to Averasboro, March 1865, rev. ed. El Dorado Hills, CA: Savas Beatie, 2017. . First published 2006 by Ironclad Publishing.

1865 in the American Civil War
1865 in North Carolina
Averasborough
Averasborough
Campaign of the Carolinas
Averasborough
March 1865 events